Hervey, New South Wales is a civil parish Narromine County west of Peak Hill, New South Wales. The Parish of Hervey is in Parkes Shire located at 32°42′54″S 148°17′04″E.

The only settlement in the parish is Trewilga, New South Wales, and the economy is based in broad acre agriculture. The traditional owners of the area were the Wiradjuri people.

References

Parishes of Narromine County
Central West (New South Wales)